The 2022 FIBA U18 Asian Championship was an international under-18 basketball competition that was held in Tehran, Iran from August 21 to 28.

The tournament, which is also the 26th edition of the biennial competition, will qualify the top four teams to represent FIBA Asia in the 2023 FIBA Under-19 Basketball World Cup in Hungary. This is the third time that Iran has hosted the tournament after hosting the 2008 and 2016 editions.

 edged  in the Final, 77-73 to claim the championship and their fourth title overall, the first since 2000. Meanwhile,  defended their Bronze Medal finish they got four years ago by defeating  in the Third Place Game, 85-68. All these teams have already secured qualifications for FIBA Asia and will compete to the 2023 FIBA U19 Basketball World Cup.

Qualification

Qualified teams 
Includes current world ranking prior to the start of the tournament (in parenthesis).

Format
This edition of the tournament will be using a different format as compared to what was used since 2018. Since there are only ten teams participating, a draw to determine the quarterfinal pairings will be held after all Preliminary games has finished. 

The qualified teams shall be divided into four (4) pots. The cumulative ranking between the three (3) groups, established according to the FIBA Official Basketball Rules, Chapter D – Classification of Teams, shall be used to determine the teams in different pots as follows:
 Pot D shall consist of two (2) best ranked teams in the cumulative ranking;
 Pot E shall consist of 3rd and 4th ranked teams in the cumulative ranking;
 Pot F shall consist of 5th and 6th ranked teams in the cumulative ranking; and
 Pot G shall consist of the 7th and 8th ranked teams in the cumulative ranking.

The teams from Pot D will be drawn against the teams from Pot G and the teams from Pot E will be drawn against the teams from Pot F;
Teams from the same group in the Group Phase cannot be drawn against each other in the Quarter-Finals.

Venue
The Azadi Basketball Hall in Tehran will host all the games of the competition.

Preliminary round
All times are local (UTC+4:30).

Group A

Group B

Group C

Knockout stage

Quarterfinal Draw

Bracket

Quarterfinals

5–8th place classification

Semifinals

Seventh place game

Fifth place game

Third place game

Final

Final standings

Awards

All-Tournament Team
 C  Yang Hansen
 F  Yuto Kawashima 
 F  Mohammad Amini
 G  Lee Ju-yeong (MVP)
 G  Lee Chae-hyung

References

Basketball
International basketball competitions hosted by Iran
Bask
FIBA Under-18 Asian Championship
2022–23 in Asian basketball
FIBA Asia Under-18 Championship